Pajero Group (Urdu and Punjabi: پجارو گروپ) is a 1994 Pakistani, action and musical film directed by Idrees Khan and produced by Shafiq Butt. Film starring actor Sultan Rahi, Ghulam Mohiuddin, Izhar Qazi, Mustafa Qureshi and Humayun Qureshi, Edited by Mohammad Ashiq Ali Hujra Shah Muqeem.

Cast 

 Sultan Rahi as (Nadar Khan)
 Neeli as (Crime Reporter)
 Ghulam Mohiuddin as (Babar)
 Saima as (Love of Babar)
 Izhar Qazi as (Anwar)
 Mustafa Qureshi as (DSP Haq Nawaz Jhangva)
 Humayun Qureshi as (Halku Khan)
 Adeeb as (Haji Sahib)
 Talish as (Khawaja Sahib)
 Bahar as (Mai Rehmatey)
 Shafqat Cheema as (Haji Rasheed)
 Raseela as (Munshi)
 Achhi Khan 
 Nasrrullah Butt as (Falak Sher)
 Afzal Khan as (Sain Baba)
 Zahir Shah - Guest's
 Altaf Khan

Soundtrack 
The music of Pajero Group is composed by Wajahat Attray with lyrics penned by Waris Ludhianvi.

Track listing

References

External links

1994 films
Pakistani action films
Pakistani political films
1990s Punjabi-language films
1990s Urdu-language films
Pakistani multilingual films
Political action films
Punjabi-language Pakistani films
Urdu-language Pakistani films